The Governor of Kurgan Oblast is the head of administration of that oblast.

Governors 

The latest election for the office was held on 14 September 2014

Sources 
World Statesmen.org

Governors of Kurgan Oblast
Politics of Kurgan Oblast
Kurgan Oblast